= Lazma =

A lazma (Arabic: لزمة; plural: lazmāt, Arabic: لزمات) is an instrumental interlude within a vocal performance in Arabic music.
